Ike Eisenmann (born July 21, 1962) is a former American actor, producer, and sound effects specialist who has been active in the entertainment industry since childhood.

Early life and education
Eisenmann was born in Houston, Texas, the son of Ruth Ann (née Gumney) and Albert Able Eisenmann Sr., an actor who appeared as "Cadet Don" on an eponymous children's television show that aired on KTRK (Channel 13) in Houston from 1959 to 1968. Ike's younger brother, Albert Able "Al" Eisenmann Jr., is also an actor, as are Al's daughter Hannah and her brother Stone.

Career
Having appeared on TV shows in the early 1970s, Ike Eisenmann first came to prominence as Tony, the brother of Tia (Kim Richards), in Walt Disney Productions' film Escape to Witch Mountain (1975) and its sequel, Return from Witch Mountain (1978). For Green Giant commercials in the 1970s and 1980s, he voiced the Little Green Sprout. He also appeared in Star Trek II: The Wrath of Khan (1982) as engineering cadet Peter Preston, Chief Engineer Montgomery Scott's nephew. 

Eisenmann starred in the NBC TV series The Fantastic Journey, and made appearances in other series including CHiPs, T. J. Hooker, The Jeffersons, Wonder Woman, Kung Fu, Mannix, Little House on the Prairie, several episodes of Gunsmoke, and several appearances on the ABC Afterschool Special. He also appeared in the TV movies Devil Dog: The Hound of Hell and Terror Out of the Sky in 1978. Eisenmann starred in the made-for-television 1982 movie Dreams Don't Die as New York subway graffiti artist Danny Baker, who tries to publish his art professionally. Though not a critical success, the film enjoyed cult status during late night rebroadcasts.

Eisenmann continued to appear in minor television roles as a teen, such as on the sitcom The Jeffersons. He also appeared in the 1978 mini-series The Bastard as the Marquis de LaFayette. His other film roles included The Formula (1980) opposite Marlon Brando and George C. Scott, Cross Creek (1983) directed by Martin Ritt, and Disney's Tom and Huck (1995) in a minor role.

Most recent work
In recent years, Eisenmann's career has been in post-production and digital animation, working under the alternative spelling of his name, Ike Eissinmann. He has often worked as a loop group actor, on movies such as American Beauty, What Lies Beneath, Meet the Parents, Madagascar, and the Shrek series. In 2002, he directed and appeared in a 12-minute short film, the spoof The Blair Witch Mountain Project.

The 2009 Witch Mountain remake, Race to Witch Mountain, features Eisenmann, in a cameo along with his original co-star, Kim Richards. Richards and Eisenmann appear in a scene together as a waitress and a sheriff, respectively.

Filmography 
Green Giant (1972–1989, commercial)
The Magical Mystery Trip Through Little Red's Head (1974) – Larry
The Sky's the Limit (1975) – Three
Escape to Witch Mountain (1975) – Tony Malone
The Kansas City Massacre (1975, TV movie) – Jimmie Floyd
The Amazing Cosmic Awareness of Duffy Moon (1976, ABC Afterschool Special) - Duffy Moon
Banjo Hackett: Roamin’ Free (1976, TV movie) – Jubal Winner
The Fantastic Journey (1977) - Scott Jordan
Kit Carson and the Mountain Men (1977, TV movie) – Randy Benton
Return from Witch Mountain (1978) – Tony
The Bastard (1978, TV miniseries) – The Marquis de LaFayette
Devil Dog: The Hound of Hell (1978, TV movie) – Charlie Barry 
Terror Out of the Sky (1978, TV movie) – Eric Mangus

 Can You Feel It (1979) - Jackson Five
The Formula (1980) – Tony
Dreams Don't Die (1982, TV movie) – Danny Baker
Star Trek II: The Wrath of Khan (1982) – Midshipman Peter Preston
Cross Creek (1983) – Paul
Nausicaä of the Valley of the Wind (1984) – (English version, voice)
GoBots: Battle of the Rock Lords (1986) – Nick Burns (voice)
Some Kind of Wonderful (1987) – Party Guest
Angel of Fury (1992) – (voice)
Pom Poko (1994) – Pom Poko (1994) – (English version, voice)
Tom and Huck (1995) – Taverner
The Blair Witch Mountain Project (2002) - Tony
Howl's Moving Castle (2004) – (English version, voice)
Race to Witch Mountain (2009) – Sheriff Anthony

References

Bibliography
 Holmstrom, John. The Moving Picture Boy: An International Encyclopaedia from 1895 to 1995. Norwich, Michael Russell, 1996, p. 340.

External links
 
 

1962 births
American male film actors
American male television actors
American male voice actors
American male child actors
Living people
Male actors from Houston